The following is an episode list for the television series Lois & Clark: The New Adventures of Superman. In the United States, the show aired on ABC, premiering on September 12, 1993, and concluding on June 14, 1997. At the end of its run, 87 (or 88 if the 2 hour pilot is split up) episodes had aired. The show is available on DVD in Regions 1, 2, and 4.

Lois & Clark: The New Adventures of Superman follows the life of Clark Kent/Superman (Dean Cain) and Lois Lane (Teri Hatcher) as they first meet, and begin a working and romantic relationship with each other. The series featured Lane Smith as Perry White, K Callan as Martha Kent, Eddie Jones as Jonathan Kent, and John Shea as Lex Luthor. Jimmy Olsen was played by Michael Landes in season one; he was let go at the end of the first season due to producers thinking he looked too much like Dean Cain. Justin Whalin was brought in for season two, and he continued the role until the series ended.

Series overview

Episodes

Season 1 (1993–94)

Season 2 (1994–95)

Season 3 (1995–96)

Season 4 (1996–97)

References

External links 
 
Lois & Clark at Kryptonsite

Lists of American fantasy television series episodes
Lists of American science fiction television series episodes
Episodes
Superman television series episodes
Lois & Clark: The New Adventures of Superman